DeWitt Webb (December 19, 1840 Clinton, Oneida County, New York – April 12, 1917 St. Augustine, Florida) was a physician, politician, and amateur naturalist. He was the founder, and for 34 years President, of the St. Augustine Historical Society and Institute of Science.

Life
Webb practiced medicine in Salt Point, New York. He was a member of the New York State Assembly (Dutchess Co., 2nd D.) in 1876 and 1877.

Webb moved to St. Augustine in 1880. He was a member of the St. Augustine Free Public Library Association. Professionally, Webb was a practicing doctor at Flagler Hospital and was head doctor at the State School for the Deaf and Blind. He was also the Acting Assistant Surgeon and Medical Officer at Fort Marion at the time when Native Americans lived there during the 1880s. Webb was a member of the Florida State Legislature and Mayor of St. Augustine in 1911 and 1912.

Webb is probably best known for his involvement in the documenting of the St. Augustine Monster of 1896. He was the only person of an academic background to examine the specimen in situ.

The Webb Building at the Oldest House of the St. Augustine Historical Society and Institute of Science was built in 1923 in his memory.

References
 Ellis, R. 1994. Monsters of the Sea. Robert Hale, London.

External links
 Le "Monstre de Floride" de 1896: Cachalot ou Pieuvre Geante? 
 

1840 births
1917 deaths
Physicians from Florida
Members of the Florida House of Representatives
Mayors of places in Florida
Republican Party members of the New York State Assembly
People from Clinton, Oneida County, New York
People from Dutchess County, New York
People from St. Augustine, Florida
19th-century American politicians